Joseph Weismann (born 19 June 1931, in Paris), is a French Shoah survivor. He was arrested during the Vel' d'Hiv Roundup: he is one of the few children to survive.

He wrote his biography entitled Après la rafle (After the Roundup) which inspired the scenario of the movie The Round Up.

Awards 
  Legion of Honour (2004)
  Escapees' Medal (2014)
  Order of Academic Palms (2014)
  Political deportation and internment medal

References 

1931 births
Living people
Holocaust survivors
Holocaust commemoration
People from Paris
French people of Jewish descent